Theobald Mathew (10 October 1790 – 8 December 1856) was an Irish Catholic priest and teetotalist reformer, popularly known as Father Mathew. He was born at Thomastown, near Golden, County Tipperary, on 10 October 1790, to James Mathew and his wife Anne, daughter of George Whyte, of Cappaghwhyte. Of the family of the Earls Landaff (his father, James, was first cousin of Thomas Mathew, father of the first earl), he was a kinsman of the clergyman Arnold Mathew.

He received his schooling in Kilkenny, then moved for a short time to Maynooth. From 1808 to 1814 he studied in Dublin, where in the latter year he was ordained to the priesthood. Having entered the Capuchin order, after a brief period of service at Kilkenny, he joined the mission in Cork.

Statues of Mathew stand on St. Patrick's Street, Cork, by J. H. Foley (1864), and on O'Connell Street, Dublin, by Mary Redmond (1893). There is a Fr. Mathew Bridge in Limerick City, named after the temperance reformer when it was rebuilt between 1844 and 1846. The Capuchin church in Cork, Holy Trinity, stands on Father Mathew Quay and was commissioned by him.

Total Abstinence Society

The movement with which his name is associated began on 10 April 1838 with the establishment of the "Knights of Father Mathew", which in less than nine months enrolled no fewer than 150,000 names. Over time this became the Catholic Total Abstinence Society. It rapidly spread to Limerick and elsewhere, and some idea of its popularity may be formed from the fact that at Nenagh 20,000 persons are said to have taken the pledge in one day, 100,000 at Galway in two days, and 70,000 in Dublin in five days. At its height, just before the Great Famine of 1845–49, his movement enrolled some 3 million people, or more than half of the adult population of Ireland. In 1844, he visited Liverpool, Manchester and London with almost equal success. 

While Father Mathew founded the temperance movement in Ireland, it was a part of a wider effort to improve the life chances of poor labourers. Teetotalism was first organised by the Preston Temperance Society, founded in 1833, and the organisations that followed had a huge worldwide impact in the 1800s. 

A biography, written shortly after his death, credits Mathew's work with a reduction in Irish crime figures of the era:The number of homicides, which was 247 in 1838, was only 105 in 1841.  There were 91 cases of 'firing at the person' reported in 1837, and but 66 in 1841. The 'assaults on police' were 91 in 1837, and but 58 in 1841. Incendiary fires, which were as many as 459 in 1838, were 390 in 1841. Robberies, thus specially reported, diminished from 725 in 1837, to 257 in 1841. The decrease in cases of 'robbery of arms' was most significant; from being 246 in 1837, they were but 111 in 1841. The offence of 'appearing in arms' showed a favourable diminution, falling from 110 in 1837, to 66 in 1841. The effect of sobriety on 'faction fights' was equally remarkable. There were 20 of such cases in 1839, and 8 in 1841. The dangerous offence of 'rescuing prisoners', which was represented by 34 in 1837, had no return in 1841! The number committed to jail fell from 12,049 in 1839 to 9,875 by 1845. Sentences of death fell from 66 in 1839 to 14 in 1846, and transportations fell from 916 to 504 over the same period.

In the United States

Mathew visited the United States in 1849, returning in 1851. While there, he found himself at the center of the abolitionist debate. Many of his hosts, including John Hughes, the Roman Catholic Archbishop of New York, were anti-abolitionists and wanted assurances that Mathew would not stray outside his remit of battling alcohol consumption. But Mathew had signed a petition (along with 60,000 Irish people, including Daniel O'Connell) encouraging the Irish in the US not to partake in slavery in 1841 during Charles Lenox Remond's tour of Ireland.

In order to avoid upsetting these anti-abolitionist friends in the US, he snubbed an invitation to publicly condemn chattel slavery, sacrificing his friendship with that movement. He defended his position by pointing out that there was nothing in the scripture that prohibited slavery. He was condemned by many on the abolitionist side, including the former slave and abolitionist Frederick Douglass who had received the pledge from Mathew in Cork in 1845. Douglass felt "grieved, humbled and mortified" by Mathew's decision to ignore slavery while campaigning in the US and "wondered how being a Catholic priest should inhibit him from denouncing the sin of slavery as much as the sin of intemperance." Douglass felt it was his duty to now "denounce and expose the conduct of Father Mathew".

Death
Mathew died on 8 December 1856 in Queenstown, County Cork (present-day Cobh), and was interred in St. Joseph's Cemetery, Cork, a cemetery which he had himself established.

Father Mathew's Tower
In 1842, at his own expense, landowner William O'Connor built a castellated neo-Gothic stone tower to commemorate Father Mathew on what was then called Mount Patrick and is now known as Tower Hill in Glounthaune which is a hamlet approximately ten miles from the city of Cork. The tower is still extant and has since been converted into a private residence while retaining many of its original features including a life-sized statue of Father Mathew that is still located in the tower's garden. Around 2014 the refurbished and modernized tower was sold for approximately one million pounds. For a detailed eyewitness description of the tower in the summer of 1848, see Asenath Nicholson's Annals of the Famine in Ireland in 1847, 1848 and 1849 Ulsterbooks, 2017, pp. 184–193.

Nicholson also discusses Father Mathew in great detail in Annals on pp. 212–214.

See also
 Catholic temperance movement

References

Footnotes

Bibliography
This article incorporates text from this public-domain publication.

Further reading

External links
 Fr. Theobald Mathew:Research and Commemorative Papers, Irish Capuchin Archives (PDF)

Irish temperance activists
1790 births
1856 deaths
Capuchins
19th-century Irish Roman Catholic priests
People from County Tipperary
Roman Catholic activists